Long Time... Seldom Scene is the Seldom Scene's first-ever release with Smithsonian Folkways. "Hickory Wind" is a homesick ballad that features the vocals of longtime friend of the Scene, Emmylou Harris, who originally recorded the song on her 'Blue Kentucky Girl' album in 1980. "Wait a Minute" is a fresh take of a song originally recorded for 1974's Old Train album and includes founding member John Starling (vocals) and guests Rickie Simpkins (fiddle) and Chris Eldridge (guitar), son of founding member Ben Eldridge (banjo).

The Seldom Scene are founding member Ben Eldridge (banjo), Lou Reid (mandolin/vocals), Dudley Connell (guitar/vocals), Ronnie Simpkins (bass/vocals), and Fred Travers (dobro/vocals).  The album was produced by three-time GRAMMY award-winning Smithsonian Folkways Sound Production Supervisor Pete Reiniger.

Track listing
 California Cottonfields 3:04
 Wait a Minute (feat. John Starling) 5:13
 What Am I Doing Hangin' Round 2:50
 Hickory Wind (feat. Emmylou Harris) 4:03
 I'll Be No Stranger There 2:20
 Walk Through This World with Me 2:32
 Big Train (From Memphis) 2:46
 With Body and Soul (feat John Starling, Emmylou Harris, and Tom Gray) 3:22
 Paradise 2:57
 It's All Over Now, Baby Blue 3:20
 Mean Mother Blues (feat. John Starling) 3:08
 My Better Years 3:08
 Little Georgia Rose (feat. John Starling) 2:54
 Like I Used to Do 4:09
 Through the Bottom of the Glass 2:43
 Lorena 5:27

Personnel
 Dudley Connell - vocals, guitar
 Lou Reid - mandolin, vocals
 Ben Eldridge - banjo, guitar, vocals
 Fred Travers - dobro, guitar, vocals
 Ronnie Simpkins - bass, vocals

with
 Chris Eldridge - guitar
 Rickie Simpkins - fiddle
 John Starling - vocals, guitar
 Tom Gray - bass
 Emmylou Harris - vocals

Chart performance

References

External links
Official site
Smithsonian Folkways

2014 albums
The Seldom Scene albums
Smithsonian Folkways albums